Giuseppe Vessicchio (born 17 March 1956) is an Italian conductor, composer, arranger, musician and television personality. He is often spelled as Beppe Vessicchio or Peppe Vessicchio.

Life and career 

Born in Naples, the son of an Eternit employee, Vessicchio frequented the Naples Conservatory without graduating. While still an university student of architecture, Vessicchio performed for a few years with the comedy ensamble Trettrè and started collaborating with some high-profile Neapolitan singers such as Peppino di Capri, Peppino Gagliardi, Fred Bongusto, Edoardo Bennato, Nino Buonocore. He had his professional breakout in the first half of the 1980s thanks to a long collaboration with Gino Paoli as an arranger, conductor (both in studio and in tours) and composer, penning among others Paoli's hits "Ti lascio una canzone", "Una lunga storia d´amore" and "Cosa farò da grande". 

Vessicchio is a popular figure of the Sanremo Music Festival, taking part at almost all the editions of the festival starting from 1990, when he served as a conductor for Mia Martini and Mango, and winning four times the critics' award for best arrangment. His collaborations include Andrea Bocelli (for whom he composed "Sogno"), Zucchero Fornaciari, Ornella Vanoni, Roberto Vecchioni, Antônio Carlos Jobim, Spagna, Max Gazzè, Ron, Mario Biondi, Le Vibrazioni, Fiordaliso, Elio e le Storie Tese, Biagio Antonacci, Rockin' 1000, Syria, Piccola Orchestra Avion Travel. He is also a composer of classical music, and his camera composition "Tarantina" was performed at La Scala in Milan.

References

External links  

 

1956 births  
Living people  
Musicians from Naples
Italian composers
Italian music arrangers 
Italian songwriters
Italian conductors (music)
Italian classical composers